This list of theatrical animated feature films consists of animated films produced or released by 20th Century Studios (formerly 20th Century Fox).

20th Century releases films from 20th Century-owned and non-20th Century owned animation studios. Most films listed below are from Blue Sky Studios which began as a feature animation department of 20th Century Animation (formerly 20th Century Fox Animation) producing its first feature-length animated film Ice Age in 2002. Beginning with Hugo the Hippo in 1975, 20th Century has released animated films by other production companies, such as DreamWorks Animation (which is now owned by Universal Pictures).

Other studio units have also released films theatrically, primarily Fox Animation Studios which only produced Anastasia and Titan A.E. before being closed in 2000, and the studio's distribution unit, which acquires film rights from outside animation studios to release films under the 20th Century Studios, or Searchlight Pictures film labels.

Films

US releases

International releases

Upcoming

Highest grossing films

See also 
 Lists of 20th Century Studios films
 List of Disney theatrical animated feature films
 20th Century Animation § Co-productions and original films
 Fox Animation Studios § Work
 List of Blue Sky Studios productions

Notes 
Release Notes

Studio/Production Notes

References

External links 
 

American animated films

Theatrical animated
20th century fox theatrical animated
Lists of American animated films